Justman is a surname. Notable people with the surname include:

 Pinchas Menachem Justman (1848–1910), Polish Hasidic Rabbe
 Robert H. Justman (1926–2008), American television producer, director and production manager
 Seth Justman (born 1951), American keyboard player
 Zuzana Justman (born 1931), Czech documentary filmmaker and writer

See also 
 Mount Justman, mountain of Antarctica